List of speakers of the Chamber of Deputies of Rwanda.

This is a list of speakers of the Chamber of Deputies of Rwanda:

Sources

See also
List of presidents of the Transitional National Assembly of Rwanda - The preceding office 1994-2003

Rwanda politics-related lists
Rwanda, House of Representatives
Speakers of the Chamber of Deputies (Rwanda)
Parliament of Rwanda